Freeway 7 (also known as Persian Gulf Highway) is a freeway in central Iran. It starts from Jahad Square at the south end of Kazemi Expressway and Azadegan Expressway in Tehran. It then passes Behesht-e Zahra, Imam Khomeini Int'l, Qom, Kashan, Natanz, Shahinshahr, Najafabad and ends northeast of Zarrinshahr in a junction with Road 51 and Zobahan Freeway. However, there has been construction after the junction and so far,  has been completed. There are also plans to connect the freeway to Shiraz.

Tehran-Esfahan section
Tehran - Qom:5000 IRR

Esfahan-Shiraz section

References
 Iran Road Maintenance & Transportation Organization
 Road management center of Iran
 Ministry of Roads & Urban Development of Iran

See also
 

7
Transport in Isfahan
Transportation in Isfahan Province
Transport in Qom
Transportation in Qom Province
Transport in Tehran
Transportation in Tehran Province